David or Dave King may refer to:

Entertainment
Dave King (actor) (1929–2002), English comedian, actor and vocalist
David King (theatre producer) (born 1956), British theatre producer
Dave King (Irish singer) (born 1961), Irish vocalist, member of the band Flogging Molly
David King (drummer) (born 1970), American drummer for Happy Apple and The Bad Plus

Politics 
David S. King (1917–2009), American politician, Representative for Utah
David Orr King (born 1938), American politician, Representative for Pennsylvania
David King (chemist) (born 1939), British chemist, former chief scientific adviser to the UK government
David Thomas King (born 1946), Canadian politician, former minister of education in Alberta
David C. King, American author, political scientist, Harvard University professor
David W. King, (born 1946) American politician from New Mexico
David D. King (jurist), New Hampshire administrative judge

Sports 
Dave King (footballer, born 1940) (1940–2010), English professional footballer
Dave King (ice hockey) (born 1947), Canadian professional ice hockey coach
Dave King (businessman) (born 1955), Scottish businessman, Rangers F.C. director
Dave King (footballer, born 1962), English professional footballer
David King (defensive back) (born 1963), American football player
David King (footballer, born 1972), Australian rules footballer for the North Melbourne Football Club
David King (punter) (born 1981), American football player from Australia 
David King (figure skater) (born 1984), British figure skater
David King (footballer, born 1985), Australian rules footballer for the Collingwood Football Club
David King (defensive end) (born 1989), American football player
David King (cricketer) (born 1990), Australian cricketer
David King (footballer, born 1990), English footballer
David King (hurler) (born 1993), Irish hurler
David King (hurdler) (born 1994), English hurdler

Writers
David King (graphic designer) (1943–2016), British graphic designer, historian, book author, collector of Soviet art
Dave King (novelist) (born 1955), American novelist and poet
David King (historian) (born 1970), American writer and historian
David A. King (historian), British-born orientalist and historian of astronomy
David Wooster King, American author, member of the French Foreign Legion during World War I

Others 
David King (artist) (1948–2019), British graphic designer and artist
David Ward King (1857–1920), farmer and inventor of the King road drag
David A. King (engineer) (born 1961/62), director of the NASA Marshall Space Flight Center

Characters
David King (Resident Evil), a character from the video game Resident Evil Outbreak 
David King, a character in the novel The Enemy
David King (Dead by Daylight), a character in the multiplayer video game Dead by Daylight

See also
King David (disambiguation)
 King (surname)